Neaethus perlucidus is a species of tropiduchid planthopper in the family Tropiduchidae. It is found in North America.

References

Articles created by Qbugbot
Insects described in 1939
Gaetuliini